Probable cation-transporting ATPase 13A2 is an enzyme that in humans is encoded by the ATP13A2 gene that is involved in the transport of divalent transition metal cations. It appears to protect cells from manganese and zinc toxicity, possibly by causing cellular efflux and/or lysosomal sequestration; and from iron toxicity, possibly by preserving lysosome integrity against iron-induced lipid peroxidation. However, it potentiates the toxic effects of cadmium and nickel on developing neurites, and of the widely used herbicide paraquat possibly by increasing polyamine uptake.

Deficiency is associated with spastic paraplegia and Kufor-Rakeb syndrome, in which there is progressive parkinsonism with dementia.

References

External links

Further reading